Moshe Varon was an Israeli footballer and manager.

Honours

As a Player-Manager
Israeli Premier League (1):
1955

References

1926 births
2007 deaths
Jewish Israeli sportspeople
Bulgarian Jews in Israel
Bulgarian emigrants to Israel
Israeli people of Bulgarian-Jewish descent
20th-century Israeli Jews
21st-century Israeli Jews
Israeli footballers
Israeli football managers
Israel national football team managers
Hapoel Petah Tikva F.C. players
Hapoel Petah Tikva F.C. managers
Hapoel Ramat Gan F.C. managers
Beitar Jerusalem F.C. managers
Hapoel Jerusalem F.C. managers
Maccabi Petah Tikva F.C. managers
Maccabi Sha'arayim F.C. managers
Maccabi Jaffa F.C. managers
Association footballers not categorized by position